Walter Jones (4 April 1925 – December 2020) was a Northern Irish professional footballer who played as a right half in the Football League for Doncaster Rovers and York City, in Northern Ireland for Linfield, and was on the books of Blackpool and Grimsby Town without making a league appearance. He died in Doncaster in December 2020, at the age of 95.

References

1925 births
2020 deaths
People from Lurgan
Association footballers from Northern Ireland
Association football wing halves
Linfield F.C. players
Blackpool F.C. players
Doncaster Rovers F.C. players
Grimsby Town F.C. players
York City F.C. players
English Football League players